Puerto Ibáñez is a small town in the Aisén Region in the south of Chile. In the 2002 census it had a population of 757. It is the capital of the commune of Río Ibáñez.

History 
The town was founded in 1924.  It was named after a Chilean miner, Cornelio Ibáñez, who spent several seasons in the area.

Economy
The town's economy is mainly based on cattle farming and crop growing, aided by a benign microclimate influenced by the lake.  Distinctive pottery is also made in the town.

Tourism is also important.

Transportation 
The town is linked to the Carretera Austral by a paved road.  There is also a car ferry across the lake to Chile Chico.

The town is served by Puerto Ingeniero Ibáñez Airport.

References 

Populated lakeshore places in Chile
Populated places in General Carrera Province